Dmitriyevka is a rural locality (a selo) in Dmitriyevsky Selsoviet of Ivanovsky District, Amur Oblast, Russia. The population was 965 as of 2018. There are 9 streets.

Geography 
Dmitriyevka is located near the right bank of the Ivanovka River, 9 km north of Ivanovka (the district's administrative centre) by road. Ivanovka is the nearest rural locality.

References 

Rural localities in Ivanovsky District, Amur Oblast